The Braille pattern dots-46 is a 6-dot braille cell with the top and bottom right dots raised, or an 8-dot braille cell with the top and lower-middle right dots raised. It is represented by the Unicode code point U+2828, and in Braille ASCII with a period: "." .

Unified Braille

In unified international braille, the braille pattern dots-46 is used to represent an unvoiced dorsal plosive, such as /k/ or /q/ when multiple letters correspond to these values, and is otherwise assigned as needed.

Table of unified braille values

Other braille

Plus dots 7 and 8

Related to Braille pattern dots-46 are Braille patterns 467, 468, and 4678, which are used in 8-dot braille systems, such as Gardner-Salinas and Luxembourgish Braille.

Related 8-dot kantenji patterns

In the Japanese kantenji braille, the standard 8-dot Braille patterns 58, 158, 458, and 1458 are the patterns related to Braille pattern dots-46, since the two additional dots of kantenji patterns 046, 467, and 0467 are placed above the base 6-dot cell, instead of below, as in standard 8-dot braille.

Kantenji using braille patterns 58, 158, 458, or 1458

This listing includes kantenji using Braille pattern dots-46 for all 6349 kanji found in JIS C 6226-1978.

  - 仁

Variants and thematic compounds

  -  selector 3 + 仁/亻  =  尢
  -  selector 4 + 仁/亻  =  司
  -  selector 4 + selector 4 + 仁/亻  =  旡
  -  selector 5 + 仁/亻  =  爰
  -  selector 6 + 仁/亻  =  尤
  -  selector 6 + selector 6 + 仁/亻  =  无
  -  仁/亻 + selector 6  =  像

Compounds of 仁 and 亻

  -  お/頁 + 仁/亻  =  仇
  -  囗 + 仁/亻  =  内
  -  ゐ/幺 + 仁/亻  =  納
  -  れ/口 + 囗 + 仁/亻  =  吶
  -  ⺼ + 囗 + 仁/亻  =  肭
  -  む/車 + 囗 + 仁/亻  =  蚋
  -  ね/示 + 囗 + 仁/亻  =  衲
  -  え/訁 + 囗 + 仁/亻  =  訥
  -  と/戸 + 囗 + 仁/亻  =  靹
  -  仁/亻 + よ/广  =  仄
  -  日 + 仁/亻 + よ/广  =  昃
  -  仁/亻 + め/目  =  仏
  -  仁/亻 + 仁/亻 + め/目  =  佛
  -  仁/亻 + こ/子  =  仔
  -  仁/亻 + 囗  =  代
  -  つ/土 + 仁/亻 + 囗  =  垈
  -  や/疒 + 仁/亻 + 囗  =  岱
  -  へ/⺩ + 仁/亻 + 囗  =  玳
  -  し/巿 + 仁/亻 + 囗  =  黛
  -  仁/亻 + に/氵  =  任
  -  ふ/女 + 仁/亻 + に/氵  =  姙
  -  る/忄 + 仁/亻 + に/氵  =  恁
  -  心 + 仁/亻 + に/氵  =  荏
  -  ね/示 + 仁/亻 + に/氵  =  袵
  -  仁/亻 + 日  =  伯
  -  れ/口 + 仁/亻  =  吏
  -  仁/亻 + 仁/亻  =  使
  -  仁/亻 + な/亻  =  便
  -  と/戸 + 仁/亻 + な/亻  =  鞭
  -  仁/亻 + は/辶  =  伴
  -  仁/亻 + し/巿  =  伸
  -  仁/亻 + れ/口  =  伽
  -  仁/亻 + ゐ/幺  =  佐
  -  仁/亻 + ひ/辶  =  佗
  -  仁/亻 + さ/阝  =  作
  -  ち/竹 + 仁/亻 + さ/阝  =  筰
  -  仁/亻 + つ/土  =  佳
  -  仁/亻 + や/疒  =  侯
  -  け/犬 + 仁/亻 + や/疒  =  猴
  -  ち/竹 + 仁/亻 + や/疒  =  篌
  -  仁/亻 + ゑ/訁  =  侵
  -  仁/亻 + み/耳  =  侶
  -  仁/亻 + ね/示  =  俵
  -  仁/亻 + 心  =  俺
  -  仁/亻 + ま/石  =  倍
  -  仁/亻 + ほ/方  =  倣
  -  仁/亻 + り/分  =  倹
  -  仁/亻 + 仁/亻 + り/分  =  儉
  -  仁/亻 + へ/⺩  =  偏
  -  仁/亻 + て/扌  =  停
  -  仁/亻 + る/忄  =  偲
  -  仁/亻 + ぬ/力  =  側
  -  仁/亻 + と/戸  =  偵
  -  仁/亻 + 火  =  偽
  -  仁/亻 + 仁/亻 + 火  =  僞
  -  仁/亻 + け/犬  =  傑
  -  仁/亻 + い/糹/#2  =  催
  -  仁/亻 + 数  =  傷
  -  仁/亻 + き/木  =  僅
  -  仁/亻 + の/禾  =  僑
  -  仁/亻 + そ/馬  =  僧
  -  仁/亻 + を/貝  =  償
  -  仁/亻 + え/訁  =  儲
  -  仁/亻 + 比  =  化
  -  え/訁 + 仁/亻 + 比  =  訛
  -  と/戸 + 仁/亻 + 比  =  靴
  -  仁/亻 + ふ/女  =  巫
  -  よ/广 + 仁/亻  =  坐
  -  て/扌 + よ/广 + 仁/亻  =  挫
  -  れ/口 + 仁/亻 + ふ/女  =  噬
  -  ち/竹 + 仁/亻 + ふ/女  =  筮
  -  え/訁 + 仁/亻 + ふ/女  =  誣
  -  仁/亻 + 氷/氵  =  攸
  -  仁/亻 + ゆ/彳  =  悠
  -  ち/竹 + 仁/亻 + ゆ/彳  =  筱
  -  い/糹/#2 + 仁/亻 + ゆ/彳  =  絛
  -  ⺼ + 仁/亻 + ゆ/彳  =  脩
  -  な/亻 + 宿 + 仁/亻  =  从
  -  仁/亻 + や/疒 + selector 1  =  仙
  -  仁/亻 + selector 1 + ぬ/力  =  仭
  -  仁/亻 + お/頁 + ろ/十  =  伜
  -  仁/亻 + 宿 + て/扌  =  佇
  -  仁/亻 + 宿 + ふ/女  =  佞
  -  仁/亻 + ほ/方 + ふ/女  =  侫
  -  仁/亻 + 宿 + つ/土  =  俑
  -  仁/亻 + 宿 + 氷/氵  =  傚
  -  仁/亻 + も/門 + selector 3  =  傴
  -  仁/亻 + 宿 + さ/阝  =  僊
  -  仁/亻 + 日 + け/犬  =  僭
  -  仁/亻 + ふ/女 + 火  =  儘
  -  仁/亻 + 龸 + 龸  =  凭
  -  仁/亻 + め/目 + 宿  =  覡

Compounds of 司 and 旡

  -  な/亻 + 仁/亻  =  伺
  -  へ/⺩ + 仁/亻  =  嗣
  -  や/疒 + 仁/亻  =  既
  -  る/忄 + 仁/亻  =  慨
  -  き/木 + 仁/亻  =  概
  -  よ/广 + や/疒 + 仁/亻  =  廐
  -  日 + や/疒 + 仁/亻  =  曁
  -  ね/示 + 仁/亻  =  祠
  -  め/目 + 仁/亻  =  覗
  -  え/訁 + 仁/亻  =  詞
  -  せ/食 + 仁/亻  =  飼
  -  ち/竹 + selector 4 + 仁/亻  =  笥
  -  よ/广 + 宿 + 仁/亻  =  厩
  -  氷/氵 + 宿 + 仁/亻  =  漑

Compounds of 爰

  -  ふ/女 + 仁/亻  =  媛
  -  て/扌 + 仁/亻  =  援
  -  日 + 仁/亻  =  暖
  -  い/糹/#2 + 仁/亻  =  緩
  -  に/氵 + 宿 + 仁/亻  =  湲
  -  火 + 宿 + 仁/亻  =  煖

Compounds of 尤 and 无

  -  龸 + 仁/亻  =  就
  -  み/耳 + 仁/亻  =  蹴
  -  仁/亻 + せ/食  =  鷲
  -  の/禾 + 仁/亻  =  稽
  -  ⺼ + selector 6 + 仁/亻  =  肬
  -  け/犬 + 宿 + 仁/亻  =  犹
  -  や/疒 + 宿 + 仁/亻  =  疣

Other compounds

  -  氷/氵 + 仁/亻  =  冶
  -  け/犬 + 仁/亻  =  奈
  -  て/扌 + け/犬 + 仁/亻  =  捺
  -  ⺼ + 仁/亻  =  脊
  -  や/疒 + ⺼ + 仁/亻  =  瘠
  -  み/耳 + ⺼ + 仁/亻  =  蹐
  -  ち/竹 + 仁/亻  =  霊
  -  ち/竹 + ち/竹 + 仁/亻  =  靈
  -  仁/亻 + ん/止  =  企
  -  と/戸 + 仁/亻  =  尼
  -  に/氵 + 仁/亻  =  泥
  -  る/忄 + と/戸 + 仁/亻  =  怩
  -  日 + と/戸 + 仁/亻  =  昵
  -  め/目 + と/戸 + 仁/亻  =  眤
  -  仁/亻 + 宿  =  介
  -  心 + 仁/亻  =  芥
  -  り/分 + 仁/亻 + 宿  =  个
  -  な/亻 + 仁/亻 + 宿  =  价
  -  た/⽥ + 仁/亻 + 宿  =  畍
  -  や/疒 + 仁/亻 + 宿  =  疥
  -  仁/亻 + ろ/十  =  令
  -  仁/亻 + お/頁  =  領
  -  な/亻 + 仁/亻 + ろ/十  =  伶
  -  囗 + 仁/亻 + ろ/十  =  囹
  -  る/忄 + 仁/亻 + ろ/十  =  怜
  -  そ/馬 + 仁/亻 + ろ/十  =  羚
  -  み/耳 + 仁/亻 + ろ/十  =  聆
  -  心 + 仁/亻 + ろ/十  =  苓
  -  む/車 + 仁/亻 + ろ/十  =  蛉
  -  と/戸 + 宿 + 仁/亻  =  丱
  -  て/扌 + 宿 + 仁/亻  =  托
  -  仁/亻 + 宿 + せ/食  =  鶺

Notes

Braille patterns